Colleen Patricia Jones  (born December 16, 1959) is a Canadian curler and television personality. She is best known as the skip of two women's world championship teams and six Tournament of Hearts Canadian women's championships, including an unprecedented four titles in a row and held the record for most Tournament of Hearts wins from when she won her 67th game 1994 until her eventual 152 wins were eclipsed by Jennifer Jones in 2021.

Jones also serves as a reporter and weather presenter for the Canadian Broadcasting Corporation, and as a curling commentator for NBC in the United States, particularly during the 2010 Winter Olympics.

In 2018, Jones finished second to Sidney Crosby in a listing of the greatest 15 athletes in Nova Scotia's history.  In 2019, she was named the third greatest Canadian curler in history in a TSN poll of broadcasters, reporters and top curlers.

Early career
Born in Halifax, Nova Scotia, Canada, from a family of curlers, at age 14, she joined the Mayflower Curling Club. She found success in competitive curling from an early age, playing skip for the St. Patrick's High School curling team. She was only 19 years old when she won the first of her 16 Nova Scotia curling titles. That led to competing in the Canadian championships, where she finished second. Jones briefly attended Dalhousie University but never graduated, opting to start work in broadcasting in her native Halifax.

In 1982 she became the youngest skip, at age 22, ever to win the Canadian women's curling championship but career, marriage and a family slowed down her competitive curling. She joined CBC Television as a reporter in 1986 and went on to cover numerous summer and winter Olympic Games. She continues to work for the CBC, and is currently a reporter for CBC Nova Scotia.

Broadcasting career
Jones began her broadcasting career in radio sports at CHUM radio in 1982. She made the switch to television broadcasting in 1984 at CTV, and joined the CBC in 1986. Beginning in 1993, Jones has been the weather presenter and sports reporter for CBC Morning News on CBC Newsworld (now CBC News Network). At the 2006 Torino Olympics, she did CBC segments about curling. Jones provided curling commentary for NBC's coverage of the 2010 Winter Olympics in Vancouver.  She served as the sideline reporter for the curling events at the 2014, 2018 and 2022 Winter Olympics.

Jones starred in a public service announcement about the Canada 2006 Census. Jones appeared in the January 15, 2008 episode of This Hour Has 22 Minutes for a skit titled MVC Most Valuable Curler.  She also co-hosts the online series That Curling Show with CBC journalist Devin Heroux.

Curling career

1999–2006
In 1999, with her new team of Kim Kelly, Mary Anne Waye (later Arsenault) and Nancy Delahunt, Jones won the Canadian curling title for the second time. The team repeated this in 2001 and they went on to win the World Curling Championship in Lausanne, Switzerland. They followed this up with another Canadian championship in 2002 and then won it for a record-setting fifth time at the 2004 Scott Tournament of Hearts. This made Jones the first skip to win four straight Canadian titles. From there the team went on to win their second World Curling Championship.

Their return at the 2005 Scott Tournament of Hearts was not as stellar. The team finished the round-robin at 6-5 and lost in a tie-breaker to Sandy Comeau of New Brunswick. When this happened, the team got a standing ovation, which even halted play in the other game that was occurring two sheets over. The following year, the team was back in form, but bowed out in the semi-finals to Jennifer Jones. At the end of the 2006 season, the team broke up. Jones joined the team of fellow Haligonian Kay Zinck, as her third. The rest of the team got a new skip in Laine Peters.

2006–2008
After a short run playing third for Kay Zinck during the 2006/2007 season,  Jones went back to skipping. For the 2007/2008 season she would add Olympic bronze medallist Georgina Wheatcroft to her team along with Kate Hamer and Darah Provencal. At the end of the season Jones would retire from competitive curling.

2010–2011
Colleen Jones announced on March 24, 2010 on CBC News that she would be again returning to competitive curling. Having been present for the 2010 Vancouver Olympics, a spark ignited in her, and she once again wanted to make another run for the 2014 Olympics in Sochi.

For the 2010/2011 season, Jones was recruited by Heather Smith-Dacey, Blisse Comstock and Teri Lake, to take over skipping duties, when former skip Jill Mouzar moved to Ontario. Just as Jones was due to begin her competitive curling comeback, days before beginning the playdowns for the Nova Scotia Scotties Tournament of Hearts, It was announced on December 10, 2010 that Jones was diagnosed with meningitis. Jones turned over skipping duties to Heather Smith-Dacey, and brought in Danielle Parsons to play at third. Smith-Dacey's team won the Nova Scotia title, and then went on to win the bronze medal at the 2011 Scotties.  Jones was able to return to competition after recovering from her illness, and won the 2011 Nova Scotia Senior Women's Championship on February 27.

2011–present
For the 2011-2012, Jones recruited a new squad, originally consisting of Kristen MacDiarmid, Helen Radford and Mary Sue Radford, all of whom previous played with Theresa Breen.  Later in the season, she modified her team adding former teammate Nancy Delahunt to third, and Marsha Sobey to second. Mary Sue Radford remained at lead. Delahunt and Sobey were members of Jones' Senior women's champion team. After failing to qualify for the provincial 2012 Nova Scotia Scotties Tournament of Hearts, Jones and her senior team of Delahunt, Sobey and Sally Saunders, participated in the 2012 Nova Scotia Women's Senior Championships. They made it to the final, where they defeated Colleen Pinkney 6-4 to win back-to-back seniors championships, qualifying for the National senior finals. With Delahunt skipping, and Jones throwing last stones, the team represented Nova Scotia at the 2012 Canadian Senior Curling Championships, where they lost in the semi-final to Newfoundland and Labrador's Cathy Cunningham.

For the 2012-2013 season Jones reunited with Mary-Anne Arsenault and Kim Kelly, with the goal of reaching the 2014 Winter Olympics in Sochi, Russia. Jones threw second stones on the team, while acting as the rink's vice skip, or "mate" while Arsenault skips.

The Arsenault-skipped team won the 2013 Nova Scotia Scotties Tournament of Hearts, and qualified for the 2013 Scotties Tournament of Hearts  in Kingston, Ontario. They finished the event with a 5-6 record.

Jones has appeared in 4 Canadian Senior Curling Championships (2011, 2012, 2015, and 2016.) She finished with a bronze medal at the 2012 Championships, and a silver medal at the 2015 Championships. She won her first Canadian Seniors in 2016 and represented Canada at the 2017 World Senior Curling Championships in Lethbridge, Alberta where her rink went through the event undefeated to win the world title.

Career highlights
Colleen Jones is a member of the Canadian Curling Hall of Fame and the Nova Scotia Sport Hall of Fame.
 World Curling Champion: 2001, 2004
 Canadian Curling Champion: 1982, 1999, 2001, 2002, 2003, 2004
 Canadian Mixed Curling Champion: 1993, 1999
 World Senior Curling Champion: 2017
 Canadian Senior Curling Champion: 2016

She was appointed to the Order of Canada in 2022.

Personal life
Jones is married to Scott Saunders and has two children.

Grand Slam record

Former events

References

External links

1959 births
Living people
Canadian women curlers
Canadian women's curling champions
Canadian mixed curling champions
Canadian people of Welsh descent
Canadian television meteorologists
Canadian television sportscasters
CBC Television people
Curling broadcasters
Dalhousie University alumni
World curling champions
Women sports announcers
Continental Cup of Curling participants
20th-century Canadian journalists
21st-century Canadian journalists
Canada Cup (curling) participants
Curlers from Nova Scotia
Sportspeople from Halifax, Nova Scotia
Canadian women television personalities
20th-century Canadian women
Members of the Order of Canada